A tusk is an elongated tooth possessed by certain mammals.

Tusk may also refer to:

People

Real people
 Donald Tusk (born 1957), Polish politician, former President of the European Council and former Polish Prime Minister
 Eberhard Koebel (1907–1955), also known as tusk, German writer and publisher
 Józef Tusk (1907–1987), grandfather of Donald
 Máel Brigte of Moray (fl. 9th century), known as Máel Brigte Tusk, Pictish nobleman

Fictional characters
 Raymond Tusk, a billionaire industrialist and éminence grise in the U.S. TV series House of Cards
 Tusk, a character from Doubutsu Sentai Zyuohger
 Tusk rapper, a character from the Black Mirror episode "Hated in the Nation"

Biology
 Cusk (fish), or tusk fish (Brosme brosme), a fish of the ling family
 Tusk shell (Scaphopoda), a class of marine mollusks

Fiction
 Tusk (comics), a character in Marvel Comics
 Tusk (Killer Instinct), a character in the 1996 arcade game Killer Instinct 2
 "Tusk", the fifth episode of Perfect Hair Forever
 "Tusk", a character from Cross Ange
"Tusk", Johnny Joestar's Stand in Steel Ball Run

Music and film
 Tusk (album), a 1979 album by Fleetwood Mac
 "Tusk" (song), a 1979 song by Fleetwood Mac
 Tusk Tour, a 1979–1980 tour by Fleetwood Mac
 Tusk (Camper Van Beethoven album), a 2002 rerecording of the Fleetwood Mac album
 Tusk (1980 film), a film by Alejandro Jodorowsky
 Tusk (2014 film), a film by Kevin Smith
 Tusk (The Dead C album), 1997
 Tusks (musician), an English singer

Acronyms
 Tank Urban Survival Kit, an upgrade package to improve the effectiveness of the M1A2 Abrams tank in urban warfare
 Tell Utilities Solar won’t be Killed, a group chaired by Barry Goldwater, Jr.

Geography 
 Tusk-e Olya, a village in Hamadan Province, Iran
 Tusk-e Sofla, a village in Hamadan Province, Iran
 The Tusk, a marble peak in the Ross Dependency, Antarctica
 The Black Tusk, a peak in the Garibaldi Provincial Park, British Columbia, Canada

Other 
 Tusk (mascot), the live mascot for the University of Arkansas, United States
 Tusk Trust, a British non-profit organisation
 USS Tusk (SS-426), an American submarine

See also 
 
 Tusker (disambiguation)